Josip Vandot (15 January 1884 – 11 July 1944) was a Slovene writer and poet who wrote mainly for young readers.

Biography

Vandot was born in Kranjska Gora in Upper Carniola, then part of Austria-Hungary, now in Slovenia. Under the interwar Kingdom of Yugoslavia, he was employed as a railway official in Maribor. In 1941, after the area was annexed by Germany, Vandot was deported to Croatia. He was killed in the Allied bombing of Slavonski Brod in 1944. A street is now named for him in Kranjska Gora.

Work 
Vandot is best known for the creation of the character Kekec, a brave and clever shepherd boy from the highlands of his home region, the Karawanks and Julian Alps. He wrote three books with Kekec as the main character:

  (Kekec on the Hard Path, 1918) 
  (Kekec on the Wolf Trail, 1922) 
  (Kekec Above the Lonely Abyss, 1924)

The Kekec books were adapted into three films about the character, although only the first was a direct adaptation of the first book:
  
  (1951) 
  (1963) (Good Luck, Kekec) – the first Slovene colour film
  (1968) (Kekec's Wiles)

References

External links

1884 births
1944 deaths
Slovenian poets
Slovenian male poets
People from Kranjska Gora
Slovenian civilians killed in World War II
20th-century poets
Deaths by airstrike during World War II